Christos Maniatis (born 5 June 1991) is a Greek footballer who plays for Thrasyvoulos F.C. in the Football League (Greece) as a right back.

Career

Christos Maniatis has previously played for Panionios F.C., Egaleo FC, Keravnos Keratea F.C. and Paniliakos . He is the younger brother of Olympiacos player Ioannis Maniatis.

References

External links
 Profile at EPAE.org
 Onsports Profile
 
 

1991 births
Living people
Greek footballers
Panionios F.C. players
Egaleo F.C. players
Paniliakos F.C. players
Thrasyvoulos F.C. players
Association football fullbacks
Footballers from Piraeus